The  Lexington Historical Museum  is a museum with a collection of historic items related to Lexington, Missouri. The Greek Revival building was constructed in 1846 and was added to the National Register of Historic Places in 1978.  It is located in the Old Neighborhoods Historic District.

History 
Originally the Cumberland Presbyterian Church, and at one time the Old Library Building, the museum was restored with help from the local gardening club, and opened in 1976.

References

Bibliography

Further reading 

Individually listed contributing properties to historic districts on the National Register in Missouri
Presbyterian churches in Missouri
Greek Revival church buildings in Missouri
Churches completed in 1846
Properties of religious function on the National Register of Historic Places in Missouri
Museums in Lafayette County, Missouri
History museums in Missouri
National Register of Historic Places in Lafayette County, Missouri